Isoparce broui is a moth of the  family Sphingidae. It is known from Mexico.

References

Sphingini
Moths described in 2001